Morbius may refer to:

Morbius, the Living Vampire, a Marvel comic book character
Morbius (film), a 2022 American superhero film based on the Marvel Comics character
Morbius (Doctor Who), a character in Doctor Who media
Dr. Edward Morbius, a character in Forbidden Planet media

See also
The Brain of Morbius, a serial of the television series Doctor Who
Moebius (disambiguation)
Morpheus, a character in The Matrix with a similar name